Qasar Qaghan was the twelfth qaghan of Uyghurs.

Reign 
According to Japanese researcher Haneda Toru (羽田亨) he was the same person as Uyghur general Jueluowu (掘羅勿) who rebelled against Zhangxin Qaghan. However, according to Michael Drompp, Qasar was a puppet ruler who was raised to the throne by Jueluowu. In any case his reign was very brief. Against usurpation, Uyghur general Külüg Bagha fled to Yenisei Kyrgyz and appealed for help. Apart from war, there was a major plague and major snow storm, causing great deaths of the Uyghur livestock and leading to its sudden decline of the state. Using opportunity, Külüg Bagha and 100000 Kyrgyz forces invaded Ordu-Baliq and burned the city. Qasar and Jueluowu were killed by a Kyrgyz leader titled Ā-rè (阿熱; Middle Chinese: /ʔɑ-ȵiᴇt̚/ < *Änäl, phonetic variant of Old Turkic İnäl), who would take the title Qaghan.

Aftermath 
Following Kyrgyz sack of capital, Uyghur minister Sazhi (馺职) and Pang Tegin (庞特勒) together with fifteen clans went to the land of the Karluk (葛逻禄) for refuge. Another group of refugees fled with Uyghur Prince Wamosi to Tang China. A remnant group continued to claim statehood under leadership of Wujie Qaghan.

References 

840 deaths
9th-century monarchs in Asia
9th-century murdered monarchs
Ädiz clan